Yasan is a village in Pir Kuh Rural District, Deylaman District, Siahkal County, Gilan Province, Iran. At the 2006 census, its population was 44, in 14 families.

References 

Populated places in Siahkal County